The plain-pouched hornbill (Rhyticeros subruficollis) is a species of hornbill in the family Bucerotidae. It is found in forests of the Dawna Range and the Tenasserim Hills of southern Myanmar, adjacent parts of western Thailand and northern Peninsular Malaysia.

It is threatened by habitat loss.

References

Birdlife Species Factsheet.

plain-pouched hornbill
Birds of the Malay Peninsula
plain-pouched hornbill
plain-pouched hornbill
Taxonomy articles created by Polbot